Marco André Rocha Pereira (born 12 January 1987), known simply as Marco, is a Portuguese professional footballer who plays for C.D. Santa Clara as a goalkeeper.

Club career
Born in Castelo de Paiva, Aveiro District, Marco came through the ranks at Boavista F.C. before moving to C.D. Trofense, initially on loan. In the 2008–09 season, the club's first in the Primeira Liga, he played 12 games and Paulo Lopes 18; his debut was a 1–0 away win against Vitória S.C. on 22 February 2009.

Marco remained playing regularly in the Segunda Liga over the ensuing seasons, for Trofense, C.D. Feirense and S.C. Freamunde. On 24 May 2017, he joined C.D. Santa Clara, being second-choice to Serginho as the Azoreans finished runners-up to C.D. Nacional. He subsequently replaced the veteran as starting goalkeeper, and in June 2021 he was rewarded for his role in a best-ever sixth-place finish with three more seasons to his contract.

Aged 34, Marco made his European debut on 22 July 2021 in the first leg of the second qualifying round of the new UEFA Europa Conference League. He kept a clean sheet in a 3–0 win away to KF Shkupi in North Macedonia, as well as the 2–0 victory in the second leg a week later.

Marco spent the vast majority of the 2022–23 campaign on the sidelines, due to a knee injury.

References

External links

1987 births
Living people
People from Castelo de Paiva
Sportspeople from Aveiro District
Portuguese footballers
Association football goalkeepers
Primeira Liga players
Liga Portugal 2 players
Boavista F.C. players
C.D. Trofense players
C.D. Feirense players
S.C. Freamunde players
C.D. Santa Clara players
Portugal youth international footballers